The TCU–Texas football rivalry is an annual college football rivalry game between the Horned Frogs of Texas Christian University and the Longhorns of the University of Texas.

History
The two Texas universities have a long history between each other. They first met on the football field on November 3, 1897, with Texas winning the contest 18–10. In 1898, the schools met twice, with Texas winning both games. The schools were members of the old Southwest Conference together from 1923 to 1995. Between the turn of the century and 1924, the Horned Frogs and Longhorns met nine times, with Texas emerging victorious each game. The largest margin of victory in the series occurred in 1915, with Texas obliterating TCU 72–0. The only tie in the series occurred in 1927, when TCU and Texas finished deadlocked at 0. Two years later in 1929, TCU recorded its first win over Texas, 15–12. Between 1932 and 1938, TCU defeated Texas six out of seven years.

After trading wins and losses during the 1940s through the 1960s, the Longhorns began their long run of dominance over the Frogs. Beginning in 1968, Texas defeated TCU in 24 consecutive matchups. The second largest margin of victory in the series occurred in 1974, with the Horns destroying the Frogs 81–16. On November 7, 1992, TCU ended the long, frustrating losing streak by defeating Texas 23–14. After a 27–19 Texas victory in 1995, the squads didn't meet again until 2007, when the Longhorns defeated the Horned Frogs 34–13.

When TCU joined the Big 12 Conference in 2012, their conference scheduling ensured that TCU and Texas will play every year on the football field. Since joining the Big 12, TCU has defeated Texas in seven of the ten matchups, with the only UT victories in that stretch coming in 2013, 2018, and 2021.

Game results

See also  
 List of NCAA college football rivalry games

References

College football rivalries in the United States
TCU Horned Frogs football
Texas Longhorns football
1897 establishments in Texas